Kole Ade-Odutola is a Nigerian Yoruba poet, photographer, and academic. He has published several books of poetry, including The Poet Bled and The Poet Fled. He was critical in the founding of the Coalition of Nigerian Artists (CONA), that advocates the Nigerian government for better visibility of the arts. He has participated in various events pushing for greater rights and access to the arts and free speech in Nigeria.

Odutola received his Bachelor of Science in Botany in 1984 from the University of Benin, in 1998, his Master's Degree in TV/Video from the University of Reading, and his Doctorate of Philosophy in Media Studies in Media from Ithaca College in 2010. He has worked as a lecturer at Rutgers University and now teaches language and cultures at the University of Florida, which he has done since 2006.

Odutola has made various speeches, lectures, and presentations regarding Nollywood, literature and poetry and mass media in Nigeria at various national and international conferences and events.

References

Yoruba poets
University of Florida faculty
Year of birth missing (living people)
Living people